The Maaji refugee settlements are three refugee camps located in Adjumani District in the Northern Region of Uganda, established in 1997. In June 2018, there were 41,764 registered refugees, accounting for 10% of the district's total population. It has primarily admitted refugees from the Second Sudanese Civil War and the ongoing South Sudanese Civil War. The settlements have been attacked several times by the Lord's Resistance Army, along with other camps in the region such as the Baratuku refugee settlement.

Location and population 
The refugee settlements are located in Adjumani District, within the West Nile sub-region of north-western Uganda, which borders South Sudan and the Democratic Republic of the Congo.

In September 2017, there were a total of 34,657 registered refugees in the settlements: 671 in Maaji I, 17,364 in Maaji II, and 16,622 in Maaji III, all South Sudanese. The total population increased by 7,107 (20.5%) to 41,764 by June 2018.

History 
In 1997, the three Maaji refugee settlements (I, II, and III) were established to receive the influx of refugees due to the Second Sudanese Civil War.

In 2002 and 2003, the rebel group Lord's Resistance Army (LRA) conducted many attacks in north-western Uganda, which housed over 100,000 refugees at the time. In one case, on 8 July 2002, approximately 200 rebels from the LRA attacked the Maaji settlements. In two hours, they killed and abducted five refugees each. They also burned and looted 126 houses, as well as classrooms and a grinding mill. An entire site was reportedly destroyed, its health centre having been robbed of drugs and equipment. The Maaji camps had approximately 11,000 residents in 2002.

Maaji II and III were later reopened in 2015 to accommodate new arrivals from the South Sudanese Civil War. The camp was reportedly no longer receiving new arrivals by September 2017, though efforts are still being made to improve the well-being of residents.

Social services 

In 2019, a project by World Vision International (WVI), in collaboration with the United Nation Development Programme, was started in Maaji II. The project aimed to promote coexistence between tribes within the settlement by providing road construction jobs (in a "cash for work" program) to selected vulnerable families. According to WVI, 130 people from the settlement and host community benefitted, although many people not part of the project still hold grudges. Another project in Maaji II, by the Women's International Peace Centre supported by the UNHCR and local governments, attempted to address conflicts primarily between the Nuer and Dinka. This project aimed to settle the causes of conflict and held mediation sessions with leaders as well as children. The district later reported improved relations between the communities within the settlement.

Facilities 
According to a 2018 UNHCR report, the quality of education has been affected by the scarcity of educational facilities and teachers in the area. There are no pre-primary schools within the settlement, while tuition fees for secondary schools are unfeasible for parents.

The report also stated that health services available at the camp are significantly affected. The lack of health facilities, resources, and workers causes congestion and long waiting hours at the health center.

The report stated that the Maaji refugees were faced with some challenges which include; lack of employment and limited access to building materials, preventing the renovation and rehabilitation of their shelters

References 

Refugee camps in Uganda
Adjumani District
South Sudan–Uganda relations